Rene "Bong" Hawkins Jr. (born November 6, 1967) is a Filipino retired professional basketball player of the Philippine Basketball Association. He is the son of character actor Rene Hawkins, Sr.

PBA career

Presto & Sta.Lucia
A power forward with the good sense of timing inside the shaded area, Bong was drafted as the second overall pick in the 1991 PBA draft. The former Perpetual Help cager was chosen by Presto coach Jimmy Mariano when the Tivolis traded Manny Victorino to Pepsi. Hawkins twisted his knee during practice and was forced to sit out in the entire first conference. He finally debut in Tivoli Milk uniform in the All-Filipino Conference and asserted his might.

In 1993, he was absorbed by newcomer Sta. Lucia Realtors, which took over the disbanded Presto franchise. Bong played one conference as a Realtor before being traded to Alaska Milkmen for Paul Alvarez beginning the 1993 PBA Commissioner's Cup.

Alaska Milkmen
In his first full season with Alaska in 1994, Hawkins led his team in both scoring and rebounding as he was the hands down choice for the league's Most Improved Player award. He became an integral part of Alaska's success starting the mid-1990s, alongside Jojo Lastimosa, Johnny Abarrientos, Poch Juinio and import Sean Chambers. 

In 1996, the Milkmen became the fourth team to win the PBA Grandslam and Hawkins was named to the Mythical Five for the second straight season. The 'Hawk' won nine championships with Alaska until the 2000 PBA season.

FedEx Express Controversy
He moved to Tanduay Rhum Masters in the 2001 season in exchange for a draft pick. When the ballclub disbanded at the end of the year, he was among the players absorbed by its buyer, the FedEx Express. However, he and the management had a feud. He wanted to have the same terms of salary that he had with the Masters while the Express based their contract on written ones. As a result, he was released and left unsigned in 2003.

Coca-Cola Tigers
In 2003, he was signed by the Coca-Cola Tigers where he was re-united with former teammates Jeffrey Cariaso, Johnny Abarrientos and Poch Juinio. He would go to win another championship with the then-San Miguel owned franchise and suited up for them until the early beginning of the 2004-05 PBA Philippine Cup.

Return to Alaska
Hawkins was signed as a free agent during the 2004-05 PBA Philippine Cup reuniting him with head coach Tim Cone. Jeffrey Cariaso, who was traded later to Alaska in the middle of the conference, also reunited with them. Despite showing signs of slowing down and playing with limited minutes, Hawkins still contributed his play-making skills with the young Alaska squad. He last played during the 3rd-Place game of the 2006 PBA Philippine Cup against San Miguel.

Retirement and post-basketball career
After the 2005-06 PBA season, Hawkins retired and worked for Tim Cone as one of his assistant coaches. During the 25th anniversary of Alaska on September 27, 2010, his number 16 was retired along with Johnny's number 14. He was snubbed from the PBA's 40 Greatest Players list.

Hawkins was invited to be on the coaching staff for the University of the Philippines Fighting Maroons Men's Basketball Team.

Hawkins also played in exhibition games after retiring, including one in Saudi in 2012, one against a selection of former NBA stars that same year, and one with former and current Alaska, Purefoods, and Ginebra players in 2015.

PBA career statistics

References

External links
Profile at pba-online.net

1967 births
Living people
Alaska Aces (PBA) players
Filipino men's basketball players
Great Taste Coffee Makers players
Philippine Basketball Association All-Stars
Philippine Basketball Association players with retired numbers
Power forwards (basketball)
Powerade Tigers players
Small forwards
Basketball players from Manila
Sta. Lucia Realtors players
Tanduay Rhum Masters players
Perpetual Altas basketball players
Great Taste Coffee Makers draft picks